The Octagonal Schoolhouse built in 1827 is an historic stone octagon-shaped school building located in the hamlet of Boquet in the western part of the town of Essex, New York. On January 17, 1973, it was added to the National Register of Historic Places.

History 
The Octagonal Schoolhouse was completed in 1827 by mill superintendent Benjamin Gilbert was charged by mill owner William Ross to build it. The school was built using money and land donated by Mr. Ross, mill employees, and the three foot thick local stones. By 1870, attendance began declining and the school was closed in 1952.

In 2015, Governor Cuomo awarded the Town of Moriah with Town of Willsboro and Town of Essex a grant to restore the schoolhouse and two other historic properties.

References

School buildings on the National Register of Historic Places in New York (state)
Octagonal school buildings in the United States
Education in New York (state)
Schoolhouses in the United States
Buildings and structures in Essex County, New York
National Register of Historic Places in Essex County, New York